Nathaniel Gist House is a historic home located near Union, Union County, South Carolina.  It was built in 1855, and is a two-story, Greek Revival brick dwelling. It features a stuccoed white, brick-columned portico. Also on the property is a stone-lined circular well constructed with stones from the Broad River and capped with pecked granite slabs.

It was added to the National Register of Historic Places in 2011.

References

Houses on the National Register of Historic Places in South Carolina
Houses completed in 1855
Greek Revival houses in South Carolina
Houses in Union County, South Carolina
Historic districts on the National Register of Historic Places in South Carolina